Rain Rock is an unincorporated community in Licking County, in the U.S. state of Ohio.

The community took its name from a nearby natural feature called Rainy Rock, a formation of sandstone with a dripping waterfall.

References

Unincorporated communities in Licking County, Ohio
Unincorporated communities in Ohio